Martinsburg Junction is an unincorporated community and census-designated place (CDP) in Blair County, Pennsylvania, United States. It was first listed as a CDP prior to the 2020 census.

The CDP is in southeastern Blair County, in the northwestern part of North Woodbury Township. It is in the Morrisons Cove region of the county, one-half mile west of the borough of Martinsburg.

Demographics

References 

Census-designated places in Blair County, Pennsylvania
Census-designated places in Pennsylvania